Jagdish Zope (born 6 September 1995) is an Indian cricketer.

He made his Twenty20 debut for Maharashtra in the 2016–17 Inter State Twenty-20 Tournament on 29 January 2017. He made his List A debut for Maharashtra in the 2016–17 Vijay Hazare Trophy on 25 February 2017. He made his first-class debut for Maharashtra in the 2017–18 Ranji Trophy on 24 October 2017.

References

External links
 

1995 births
Living people
Indian cricketers
Maharashtra cricketers
People from Jalgaon